The Bus Bloc, or Bloc de la Busira-Momboyo, was a huge concession in the Congo Free State, later the Belgian Congo, operated by the Société anonyme belge pour le commerce du Haut-Congo (SAB).
It covered land along and between the Busira River and Momboyo River.
In the early days the SAB exploited the local people ruthlessly in their demands for rubber, and many died.

SAB trading posts

As of 1 January 1894 the Société anonyme belge pour le commerce du Haut-Congo (SAB) had 83 factories and posts, including some in the French territory to the west of the Congo and Ubangi rivers.
A map shows the company had posts along the upper Ruki River (i.e. the Busira) at Bilakamba, Bombimba, Bussira Manene, Moniaca, Bocoté and Yolongo. It also had a post at Bomputu on the Lengué (Salonga) River, and posts at Balalondzy, Ivulu and Ivuku on the Momboyo River.
The post at Monieka formally established in 1901.

Concessions

The Compagnie du Congo pour le Commerce et l'Industrie (CCCI) was given the right to 1 of land in return for its services in studying the Matadi-Léopoldville Railway project.
 of the CCCI concession was in the general area of the Bus Bloc, but of this  were outside its future boundaries.

The CFC chose  within the future Bus Bloc, and as of 1901 still had  unallocated.
In an agreement of 9 November 1901 the Congo Free State agreed to allocate the CFC's remaining 539,326 hectares in an area between the Salonga and Busira rivers, and to add another , as long as this included the  already allocated in the Busira-Momboyo basin, forming a single bloc.

It took some time to settle on the limits of the bloc, which were finally established in an agreement on 13 December 1904.
The state took back some of the land outside the bloc, but left the Busira-Manene plantations.
Some land was reserved for a native people or for public use.

History

Under the agreement of 27 December 1901 the SAB was responsible for industrial, agricultural and commercial exploitation of the Bloc and received a share of the proceeds in compensation.
Property rights were shared, with the CFC getting half and the CCCI and SAB each getting a quarter.
Between 1902 and 1910 the SAB sublet most of its activities to the Compagnie du Kasaï and Société du Busira concession companies.
After this, SAB began to expand again as the concession system was gradually phased out.
In 1911 Charles Batjoens headed a mission to delimit the Bus Bloc at Bussanga (Equateur).

The Belgians treated the local people brutally and forced them to extract rubber in appalling conditions.
It is estimated that hundreds of thousands died as victims to the agents of the Anglo-Belgian India Rubber Company (ABIR) or of the SAB in the Bus-Bloc.
He called them "low down white trash".
A rebellion that began in Sankuru in 1920 spread to the SAB's Bus Bloc concession on the Upper Busira.
The rebels attacked state posts, trading stations, factories, homes and a Catholic chapel.
The military arrived in March 1921 and over the next five months killed at least 115 rebels.

On 21 March 1927 the SAB received all the land rights in the bloc.
The capital and number of shares in the SAB was increased, and the CCCI and CFC were compensated with shares in SAB.
The SAB was compensated financially and in land.
On 19 October 1937 the entire area was opened to free trade.

Notes

Sources

Congo Free State
Belgian Congo